is a railway station on Kintetsu Railway's Kyoto Line in Kyōtanabe, Kyoto, Japan

Lines

Kintetsu Railway
Kyoto Line

Layout
The station has an island platform and four tracks.

Tracks 1 and 4 are used for passing trains.

History
 1993-03-18 - Miyamaki Signal Box opens to serve new Miyazu Train Yard
 1993-09-21 - Miyamaki Signal Box become a passenger station named Kintetsu Miyazu Station

Adjacent stations

References

External links
 Official Website

Railway stations in Kyoto Prefecture
Railway stations in Japan opened in 1993